Samuel Ward was a Scottish professional football centre half who played in the Scottish League for Morton. He also played in the Football League for Brentford.

Career statistics

References

Scottish footballers
English Football League players
Brentford F.C. players
Association football central defenders
Year of death missing
Greenock Morton F.C. players
People from Dennistoun
1906 births
Shawfield F.C. players
Scottish Football League players